Morelia imbricata is a large snake found in southern regions of Western Australia and western South Australia. A member of the python family, it is commonly known as the southwestern carpet python.

Taxonomy
A member of the Pythonidae, M. imbricata is closely related to other Australian diamond or carpet pythons (genus Morelia). The abundant and well known genus Morelia contains six species across Australia.

Description
This species has a well defined neck and small scales across the head.

Several other similar pythons occur in its range. The woma, Aspidites ramsayi, lacks the obvious neck of M. spilota imbricata, and the western Stimson's python, Antaresia stimsoni stimsoni, has a higher number of ventral scales.

Habitat
The habitat is coastal areas, woodland, heathland, and semiarid areas. It is often found in woodlands of Eucalypt and Banksia, or amongst grasses or low growing shrubs.

Behavior
It is discreet and slow moving, spending most of its time hidden, though occasionally it is seen attempting to cross roads. Typically this python is sedentary, but females in a survey at Garden Island were noted to be active most of the year. M. imbricata takes up residence in deep crevices or holes in limestone, on granite, in dense heath, and animal burrows.

Diet
This species eats geckos, house mice, birds, and marsupials, including the Tammar wallaby.
The young of brooding red-eared firetails, Stagonopleura oculata, were taken from a nest being observed.

Home range
Males tend to have a larger range. They appear to return to the same sites, even after long absences, which may contribute to a threat of extinction.

Conservation
Morelia imbricata is widespread and thought to have large populations, but is exposed to the threatening processes of its distribution range. Noted in the assessment of its conservation status are land clearing and altered fire regimes, as it typically occupies a large undisturbed habitat. The impact of introduced predators, known to be foxes and cats, have not been assessed. Population densities have declined in the Esperance region.  The various threat assessments have described it as near threatened (Red list 2000) and 'specially protected fauna' under its region's Wildlife Conservation Act. The hollow logs favored by the species are not produced by altered fire regimes or cleared in plantations.

Geographic range
It occupies all the regions of Southwest Australia, a typical Mediterranean climate, and into the central arid and semiarid regions. The northern extent is to Northampton north of Geraldton and it is found as far east as the Eyre Peninsula. The python also occurs on islands at the Houtman Abrolhos, Garden Island, and the Archipelago of the Recherche. There are records of the subspecies beyond the eastern mainland range from St Francis Island in South Australia's Nuyts Archipelago.

References

External links

 

Reptiles of Western Australia
Morelia (snake)
Snakes of Australia
Animals described in 1981
Taxobox binomials not recognized by IUCN